Réka Demeter (born 26 September 1991 in Esztergom) is a Hungarian football defender, currently playing for UE L'Estartit in Spain's Primera División. She previously played for Ferencváros and MTK Hungária FC in Hungary's Noi NB I.

She is a member of the Hungarian national team.

References

1991 births
Living people
Hungarian women's footballers
Hungary women's international footballers
Ferencvárosi TC (women) footballers
MTK Hungária FC (women) players
Expatriate women's footballers in Spain
Hungarian expatriate sportspeople in Spain
UE L'Estartit players
People from Esztergom
Women's association football defenders
Sportspeople from Komárom-Esztergom County